Tasos Mitsopoulos (Greek:Τάσος Μητσόπουλος; 30 May 1965 – 22 March 2014) was a Cypriot politician. He served as a member of the House of Representatives from 2006 until 2013 for Democratic Rally. He then joined the cabinet of Nicos Anastasiades as Minister of Communications. In a cabinet reshuffle on 14 March 2014 he was appointed Minister of Defence.

Biography
Mitsopoulos was born on 30 May 1965 in Larnaca. In 1978 he joined Protoporia, the youth organisation of the political party Democratic Rally, he would stay member until 2000. Between 1988 and 1990 he was also part of the leadership of the Youth Organisation of New Democracy of Greece. He studied law at the National and Kapodistrian University of Athens. In Greece he also served as an adviser to Dimitris Avramopoulos and Kostis Chatzidakis.

Mitsopoulos was director of the office of Democratic Rally leader Nicos Anastasiades between 1997 and 2005, while serving as his spokesperson between 1999 and 2008. He served as a member of the House of Representatives from 2006 until 2013 representing Larnaca District for Democratic Rally. He then joined the cabinet of Nicos Anastasiades as Minister for Communications and Works. In a cabinet reshuffle on 14 March 2014 he was appointed Minister of Defence.

Mitsopoulos was found unconscious in his office on 21 March 2014, after having suffered cerebral hemorrhage due to a ruptured aneurysm. He was rushed to Nicosia New General Hospital, where he died one day later in the presence of family, friends and cabinet members, including President Anastasiades. A three-day mourning period was declared after his death.

Mitsopoulos was married and had a son and daughter.

References

1965 births
2014 deaths
People from Larnaca
National and Kapodistrian University of Athens alumni
Democratic Rally politicians
Members of the House of Representatives (Cyprus)
Cyprus Ministers of Communications and Works
Cyprus Ministers of Defence